Emil J. Boucek (April 20, 1917 – March 3, 2005) was an American politician.

Born in Chicago, Illinois, Boucek served as a constable and as a bailiff for Cook County, Illinois. He also served as a village clerk for Brookfield, Illinois. He lived in Western Springs, Illinois. Boucek served in the Illinois House of Representatives from 1977 to 1983 and was a Republican. He died from pancreatic cancer at his home in Willowbrook, Illinois.

Notes

1917 births
2005 deaths
Politicians from Chicago
People from Western Springs, Illinois
Republican Party members of the Illinois House of Representatives
Deaths from pancreatic cancer
Deaths from cancer in Illinois
20th-century American politicians